Men of the Sky (aka Call of the East' and Stolen Dreams ) is a 1931 all-talking American pre-Code musical drama film, directed by Albert E. Green which was produced by Warner Bros. in 1930 and released in 1931.  Men of the Sky stars Irene Delroy and  Jack Whiting. Although aircraft were seen in the film, Men of the Sky was more of a spy drama.

Plot
In the years before World War I, a love affair takes place between an American pilot named Jack Ames (Jack Whiting) and a French spy named Madeleine Aubert (Irene Delroy). Madeleine leaves her American fiancé to join her father (John St. Polis), another French spy, at an estate in Germany. Her father instructs her to accept the invitation of a Prussian officer, Eric von Coburg (Bramwell Fletcher), to live at his estate for a month.

Jack, believing that Madeleine no longer loves him, joins the Lafayette Escadrille, a squadron of French and American flyers. His first duty is to take a French spy, dressed as a Prussian officer, over the lines. The spy is wounded during the crossing, however, and Jack must take his place.

The French spy tells Jack that another French spy will signal him on the piano, playing a happy tune if danger threatens and sad music if the house is safe. Jack puts on the spy's uniform and arrives to find Madeleine at the piano. After Madeleine explains her mission, they continue to exchange messages.

The Germans, however, become suspicious of Madeleine and on a night Jack is set to visit, she is entertaining officers of the German intelligence. One of them asks her to play sad music. Realizing that this will place Jack in danger, she signals Jack in Morse code with her left hand. The officers discover the trick, and Jack and Madeleine are captured, accompanying her father to the firing squad.

Cast

 Irene Delroy as Madeleine Aubert
 Jack Whiting as Jack Ames
 Bramwell Fletcher as Eric von Coburg
 Otto A. Harbach as French Major
 Armand Kaliz as Senor Mendoca
 Edwin Maxwell as Count
 John St. Polis as Madeleine's Father

Production
The original story and music were written by Otto A. Harbach and Jerome Kern. The film was originally intended to be released, in the United States, early in 1931, but was shelved due to public apathy towards musicals. Despite waiting a number of months, the public proved obstinate and the Warner Bros. reluctantly released the film in June 1931 after making some cuts. The film was released outside the United States (since there was no backlash against musicals outside the United States) as a full musical early in 1931.

Men of the Sky was originally intended to be photographed entirely in Technicolor, but this was dropped midway into production when the studio realized due to the public backlash against musicals. The film was originally titled Call of the East but was retitled twice more before release: first to Stolen Dreams, then to Men of the Sky. Much of the music was cut and the film began to be advertised as a spy war drama. As a cost-saving measure, it was decided to release the film in black and white as color had come to be associated with musicals.

The film was to have been the first of three of musicals to be written by Otto A. Harbach and Jerome Kern for Warner Bros. Due to the public apathy for musicals, however, Warner Bros. bought out their contract and the team returned to Broadway.

Songs

 "Ev'ry Little While" 
 "Cottage of Content"  
 "Stolen Dreams (Who Steals All My Dreams?)" 
 "All's Well with the World"
 "I'll Share them All with You (Canzonetta)"
 "Man in the Sky"
"Suzette"
 "What's Become of Spring"
 "You've Got To Meet Marguerite"
 "Flying Field"
 "Chamber Music and Boy's March"
 "Choir"

Reception
Men of the Sky was not widely released. Warner Bros. did not debut this film in the usual prestigious movie theaters. The film was immediately placed in general release with no fanfare. Very few reviewers had a chance to see the film, although Film Daily noted that there was a musical background. The surviving music does include a "conspicuous amount of music".

Preservation status
Men of the Sky is considered to be a lost film since no film elements are known to exist. The soundtrack, which was recorded on Vitaphone disks, has survived in private hands.

See also
List of lost films

References

Notes

Citations

Bibliography

 Barrios, Richard. A Song in the Dark: The Birth of the Musical Film.  Oxford, UK: Oxford University Press, 1995. .
 Bradley Edwin M. The First Hollywood Musicals: A Critical Filmography of 171 Features, 1927 Through 1932. Jefferson, North Carolina: Mcfarland & Co Inc., 2004. .
 Wynne, H. Hugh. The Motion Picture Stunt Pilots and Hollywood's Classic Aviation Movies. Missoula, Montana: Pictorial Histories Publishing Co., 1987. .

External links
 
 
 

1931 films
American aviation films
American black-and-white films
Films directed by Alfred E. Green
First National Pictures films
Lost American films
American musical drama films
American World War I films
1930s musical drama films
1931 lost films
1931 drama films
1930s English-language films
1930s American films